Luc Violette (born March 8, 1999) is an American curler from Edmonds, Washington. He is a five-time United States Junior Champion and was a silver medalist at both the 2016 Winter Youth Olympics and the 2017 World Junior Championships.

Curling career 
Violette started curling competitively at eleven years old. At his first three appearances at the United States Junior Curling Championships Violette played second for Jake Vukich's team, culminating winning the championship in 2014. As Team USA at the 2014 World Championships, they finished in ninth place.

As part of the United States Curling Association's (USCA) Junior High Performance Program, Violette was the alternate for Korey Dropkin's team for the 2014–15 season. Violette earned his second Junior Nationals silver medal at the 2015 Championship, and then competed at his first United States Men's Championship, where they finished seventh. The next season, Violette and Andrew Stopera, who played lead for Team Dropkin the year before, formed a new team with Stopera as skip, Violette at third, Steven Szemple at second, and William Pryor at lead. The new lineup earned bronze at the 2016 Junior Nationals.

For the 2016–17 season, Team Stopera got a new front end, with Ben Richardson joining at second and Graem Fenson at lead. This line-up won the next three United States Junior Championships, 2017–2019. Winning Junior Nationals earned them the chance to represent the United States at the World Junior Championships. At the 2017 Worlds, they earned the silver medal when they lost to Lee Ki-jeong's South Korean team in the final. At the 2018 Worlds they made it to the bronze medal match but lost to Team Switzerland. At the Worlds in 2019, their final as Team Stopera, they finished fifth. Also in 2019 they played at the Winter University Games in Krasnoyarsk, Russia, where they finished in eighth place.

Stopera aged out of juniors after the 2018–19 season and Violette took over as skip for the next season, with former alternate Riley Fenson becoming lead. Their success at the US Junior Championships continued, winning gold for the fourth year in a row. At the 2020 World Championships they finished in seventh place. Violette, Richardson, and Harstad aged out of juniors after the 2019–20 season
and for the following season got selected together, along with Chase Sinnett at third, as the USCA's new men's U-25 national team. The U-25 team program, which stands for under 25 years old, was added in 2020 as a new part of the High Performance Program with the intention of bridging the development gap between juniors and men's curling.

Personal life 
Violette's father Tom Violette is also a curler, he is a two-time national champion and a bronze medalist at the 1992 World Men's Championship.

Violette attended Edmonds College.

Teams

Men's

Mixed

References

External links 
 

Living people
1999 births
American male curlers
Sportspeople from Seattle
Curlers at the 2016 Winter Youth Olympics
Youth Olympic silver medalists for the United States
Competitors at the 2019 Winter Universiade
Competitors at the 2023 Winter World University Games
Medalists at the 2023 Winter World University Games
People from Edmonds, Washington